The Women's +61 kg para-sport powerlifting event at the 2014 Commonwealth Games in Glasgow, Scotland, took place at Scottish Exhibition and Conference Centre on 2 August.

Result

References

Weightlifting at the 2014 Commonwealth Games
Com